Tewo may refer to:

 Têwo County in Gansu province, China
 Tew'o, a town in Djibouti